Abraham Andrews Barker (March 30, 1816March 18, 1898) served as a soldier during the American Civil War, and was a Republican member of the U.S. House of Representatives from Pennsylvania.

Early life and career

Barker was born in Lovell in Massachusetts' District of Maine. His parents were Stephen Barker and Betsey Andrews. Barker received a small education, up until he was sixteen. In 1842, he married Orsina Little. Orsina was the granddaughter of Jonathan Clark and Moses Little. Barker engaged in agricultural pursuits and also in the shook business.  He moved to Carrolltown, Pennsylvania, in 1854 and later to Ebensburg, Pennsylvania, where he continued the shook business. Barker also worked with Neal Dow in favor of the Maine law. Barker was an ardent prohibitionist. He also engaged in the mercantile business in 1858 and later in the lumber business. He became the president of the Ebensburg and Cresson Branch Railroad, until it was taken over by the Pennsylvania Railroad.

Political Career and later life
Barker was a delegate to the 1860 Republican National Convention. He cast his vote for the nomination of Abraham Lincoln at the convention. During the American Civil War, he served in Company E, Fourth Regiment, Pennsylvania Emergency Troops. Barker was elected as a Republican to the Thirty-ninth Congress. He was an unsuccessful candidate for renomination in 1866 and for election as a Republican in 1872. After leaving congress, Barker left the Republican Party to join to the Prohibition Party in 1876. From 1878 to 1882, Barker served as the president of the Pennsylvania Prohibition Party. He reengaged in the lumber and shook business until 1880. Barker was also highly involved in Freemasonry. In 1896 Barker was nominated to run for congress by the Prohibition Party. This was his final political race, and he lost. He died in Altoona, Pennsylvania, while on a visit for medical treatment in 1898.

Notes

References

Storey, Henry Wilson; "History of Cambria County, Pennsylvania, Volume 2", Lewis Publishing Company, (1907)
Union Publishing Co. (Philadelphia); "Biographical and portrait cyclopedia of Cambria County, Pennsylvania: comprising five hundred sketches of the prominent and representative citizens of the county", Union Publishing Co, (1896)
 Retrieved on 2008-02-14

External links
The Political Graveyard

1816 births
1898 deaths
Union Army soldiers
People from Lovell, Maine
People of Maine in the American Civil War
Pennsylvania Prohibitionists
People from Cheltenham, Pennsylvania
Republican Party members of the United States House of Representatives from Pennsylvania
19th-century American politicians
Activists from Pennsylvania